Chanca or Chanka may refer to:

 Chanca people, an ethnic group of Peru
 Chanca Quechua, a language of Peru
 Chhanka, a mountain in Peru
 Cerro Chanka, a lava dome in Peru
 Chança River, a river in Spain and Portugal

See also 
 Diego Álvarez Chanca, 15th-century Spanish physician